Political correctness is language, ideas, policies, or behaviour seeking to minimize offense to groups of people.

Politically Correct may also refer to:

"Politically Correct" (song), a single released in 2000 by the American rock band SR-71

See also
Politically Correct Bedtime Stories, book by James Finn Garner, published in 1994
PCU (film), a 1994 comedy film, "Politically Correct University"
Politically incorrect (disambiguation)